Hugh Allen Meade (April 4, 1907 – July 8, 1949) was a U.S. Congressman, representing the second district of Maryland from 1947 to 1949.

Born in Netcong, Morris County, New Jersey, Meade attended the public schools. He moved to Baltimore, Maryland in 1923 and graduated from Loyola High School in 1925, and from Loyola College in Maryland in 1929. He later graduated from the University of Maryland Law School in 1932 and was admitted to the bar in 1933

Meade served as secretary to Albert Ritchie, Governor of Maryland, in 1934. He was later a member of the Maryland House of Delegates from 1934 to 1936, supervisor of assessments of the city of Baltimore from 1936 1938, and Assistant Attorney General of Maryland from 1938 to 1946.

During World War II, Meade served in the United States Navy as a lieutenant in 1944 and 1945. He resigned from the attorney general's office in 1946 to enter the private practice of law. He was elected as a Democrat in 1946 to the Eightieth Congress, but was an unsuccessful candidate for renomination in 1948, and served one full term from January 3, 1947, to January 3, 1949.

After Congress, Meade was appointed general counsel of the Merchant Marine and Fisheries Committee of the United States House of Representatives in January 1949 and served until his death in Washington, D.C. He is interred in the New Cathedral Cemetery in Baltimore.

References 

1907 births
1949 deaths
United States Navy personnel of World War II
Loyola University Maryland alumni
Democratic Party members of the Maryland House of Delegates
People from Morris County, New Jersey
United States Navy officers
University of Maryland Francis King Carey School of Law alumni
Democratic Party members of the United States House of Representatives from Maryland
20th-century American politicians
Military personnel from New Jersey